KRVG (95.5 FM, "The River") is a radio station broadcasting an adult hits music format. It is licensed to Glenwood Springs, Colorado, United States. The station is currently owned by Western S Communications, L.L.C. and features programming from Westwood One.

References

External links

RVG
Radio stations established in 1987